Night on Fire is the debut album by VHS or Beta. It was released September 21, 2004 on Astralwerks.

The song "Night on Fire" was featured on the video game MLB 06 : The Show and the film Grandma's Boy.

Track listing
 "Night on Fire" – 4:01
 "You Got Me" – 3:36
 "Nightwaves" – 5:41
 "The Melting Moon" – 4:20
 "No Cabaret!" – 5:47
 "Forever" – 5:43
 "Alive" – 5:05
 "Dynamize" – 4:49
 "The Ocean" – 4:36
 "Irreversible" – 9:00

References

External links
VHS or Beta official website
Astralwerks Records

2004 albums
VHS or Beta albums
Astralwerks albums